Till is the fourth studio album by The Vogues, released by Reprise Records in 1969 under catalog number RS 6326.

The album was reissued, combined with their 1968 album Turn Around, Look at Me, on Compact disc by Taragon Records on November 6, 2001.

Track listing

External links

1969 albums
The Vogues albums
Reprise Records albums